The Eastern Express Busway, originally known as the Doncaster Busway, is a planned bus rapid transit line in Melbourne, Australia. It will run from Doncaster on dedicated bus lanes on the Eastern Freeway to Hoddle Street, with a new bus station at the Bulleen Road intersection. It is part of the North East Link project. The project is being managed by Transdev, and is estimated to cost 500 million Australian dollars. There has also been a proposal to use trackless trams for the busway.

See also 
 Brisbane busways
 Doncaster railway line

References 

Proposed buildings and structures in Melbourne
Bus rapid transit in Australia